Niki De Cock (born 30 December 1985) is a Belgian football midfielder currently playing for Lierse SK in the Belgian First Division. She has also played in the Dutch Eredivisie for Willem II. Her first game in the European Cup was in 2005 with FCL Rapide Wezemaal.

She is a member of the Belgian national team.

Titles
 2 Belgian Leagues (2004, 2005)
 3 Belgian Cups (2001, 2003, 2004)
 1 Belgian Supercup (2005)

References

1985 births
Living people
Belgian women's footballers
Expatriate women's footballers in the Netherlands
People from Lier, Belgium
Women's association football midfielders
Belgium women's international footballers
Willem II (women) players
RSC Anderlecht (women) players
Belgian expatriate sportspeople in the Netherlands
Eredivisie (women) players
BeNe League players
Belgian expatriate women's footballers
Lierse SK (women) players
Footballers from Antwerp Province